Linton Stephens Covered Bridge, also known as Linton Stevens Covered Bridge, is a historic wooden covered bridge located in Elk Township and New London Township, Chester County, Pennsylvania.  It is a  Burr truss bridge, constructed in 1886.  It crosses Big Elk Creek.

It was listed on the National Register of Historic Places in 1980. The bridge was damaged and closed by flooding caused by Hurricane Ida on September 1, 2021.

References 
 

Covered bridges on the National Register of Historic Places in Pennsylvania
Covered bridges in Chester County, Pennsylvania
Bridges completed in 1886
Wooden bridges in Pennsylvania
Bridges in Chester County, Pennsylvania
National Register of Historic Places in Chester County, Pennsylvania
Road bridges on the National Register of Historic Places in Pennsylvania
Burr Truss bridges in the United States
1886 establishments in Pennsylvania